is a town and the administrative centre of Sortland Municipality in Nordland county, Norway.  The town is located on the east coast of the island of Langøya, along the Sortlandsundet strait.  In 1997, the municipality decided to declare "town status" for the urban area of Sortland.  Sortland is the largest town and commercial centre in the whole Vesterålen region and is often referred to as "the blue town by the strait" since many of the buildings are painted blue.

The Norwegian National Road 85 highway begins at Sortland and crosses the Sortland Bridge to connect the town to the nearby European route E10 highway on the neighboring island of Hinnøya.

The town has a regional high school, a cultural centre, library, cinema, Sortland Museum, and Sortland Church.  The town is also a regular stop of the Hurtigruten boats.

Etymology
The town (and municipality) is named after the old Sortland farm (Old Norse: Svortuland), since the first Sortland Church was built there. The first element is the genitive case of a river name Svorta and the last element is land which means "land" or "farm". The river name is derived from svartr which means "black/dark".

Media gallery

See also
List of towns and cities in Norway

References

Sortland
Cities and towns in Norway
Populated places in Nordland
Populated places of Arctic Norway